Eugène Albert Puyou de Pouvourville (pen name: Matgioi; 7 August 1861 – 30 December 1939) was a French orientalist, mystic, poet, and translator.

Biography
He was born in Nancy into a military family, and took part in several expeditions in China serving in military and administrative capacities. His long periods of living in Tonkin and other provinces enabled him to understand Chinese thought. Under the influence of a Taoist master, he was initiated into a Chinese secret society, and adopted the name "Matgiol".

He eventually returned to France, and occupied himself with the teaching of Taoism. He presented Taoist doctrines in his works, especially La Voie Métaphysique and La Voie Rationale, emphasizing both the principles and the applications of the system.  He also wrote several book on China and the French colonies in Asia.

He died in Paris.

Works
 Le Tao de Laotseu, translated from Chinese by Matgioi,  Librairie de l'Art indépendant, 1894, 48 pp. (rééd. Hachette/BnF, 2012 
 Le Te de Laotseu, translated from Chinese by Matgioi,  Librairie de l'Art indépendant, 1894, 63 pp. (rééd. Hachette /Bibliothèque nationale de France, 2013 
 L'esprit des races jaunes. « Le Traité des Influences errantes » de Quangdzu, translated from Chinese by Matgioi, Paris, Bibliothèque de la Haute Science, 1896, 51 pp.
 L'Empire du Milieu, Schlercher frère, 1900
 Rimes chinoises, Lemerre, 1904
 La Voie Métaphysique, Paris, Société d'Éditions Contemporaines : Bibliothèque de La Voie, 1905, 168 pp. (Rééd. Les Éditions Traditionnelles, 1956, 1991).
 La Voie Rationnelle, Paris, Société d'Éditions Contemporaines : Bibliothèque de la Voie, 1907, 269 pp. (Rééd. Les Éditions Traditionnelles, 2003).
 La Chine des Lettrés, Librairie Hermétique (Bibliothèque de la Voie), 1910, 160 pp.
 Les Enseignements Secrets de la Gnose - T Simon (Albert de Pouvourville) T Théophane (Léon Champrenaud), Éditions Arche, Milan 1999
 Le Livre de l'opium, sous le pseudonyme de Nguyen Te Duc, réédition Guy Tredaniel, Paris 2002
 Le Cinquième Bonheur, Éd. Kailash, 2004 
 L’Art indo-chinois, Librairie-Imprimeries Réunies Ancienne Maison Quantin, 1894. Coll. Bibliothèque de l’enseignement des Beaux-Arts
 Francis Garnier, Plon, 1931
  La Voie - revue mensuelle de haute science - articles à partir du n°1 du 15 avril 1904

Bibliography 
 Jean-Pierre Laurant, Matgioi, un aventurier taoïste, Éditions Dervy, 1982  
 Patrick Laude, Exotisme indochinois et poésie : étude sur l'œuvre poétique d’Alfred Droin, Jeanne Leuba et Albert de Pouvourville, Sudestasie, 1990 
 Divers textes d'Albert de Pouvourville ont été lus dans le film de Jacques Perrin, L'Empire du milieu du sud (2010).

External links 
 Extrait du chapitre IV de La Voie métaphysique 
 Biographie et liste des œuvres d'Albert de Pouvourville sur le site des Lettres du Mékong

1861 births
1939 deaths
French male poets
French male non-fiction writers
French Christian mystics
French orientalists
French translators